Violaine Averous (born 15 March 1985 at Toulouse) is a French athlete, who specializes in race walking.

Biography

Prize list  
 French Championships in Athletics   :  
 winner of 10 000 m walk:  2013

Records

Notes and references

External links  
 
  profile Violaine Aveorus on the site of the FFA

1985 births
Living people
French female racewalkers